Lareau is a Canadian French surname. It may refer to:

People
 Annette Lareau, an American professor and sociologist
 Edmond Lareau (1848–1890), a Canadian lawyer, author, journalist and political figure
 Sébastien Lareau (born 1973), a Canadian tennis player

References